Club Deportivo Torreperogil is a Spanish football club located in Torreperogil, in the autonomous community of Andalusia. Founded in 1975 and refounded in 2008, it currently plays in Tercera División RFEF – Group 9, holding home matches at Estadio Abdón Martínez Fariñas, with a capacity of 3,000 spectators.

History 
There were different clubs from Torreperogil before, such as UD Perogilense, AD Torres and Sporting de Torreperogil. CD Torreperogil was refounded in 2008 and it became the main team of the town.

Season to season

CD Torreperogil (1975)

1 season in Tercera División

CD Torreperogil (2008)

3 seasons in Tercera División
1 season in Tercera División RFEF

References

Association football clubs established in 1975
Football clubs in Andalusia
Divisiones Regionales de Fútbol clubs
1975 establishments in Spain
Province of Jaén (Spain)